The Whitby High School is a co-educational secondary foundation school, situated in Whitby, a suburb of Ellesmere Port, Cheshire, England.

Admissions
It is maintained by the Cheshire West and Chester Local Education Authority. The school educates pupils from 11–18 as it has a Sixth Form. It is a specialist Technology College. It is situated on the A5032 Chester Road. The area known as Whitby is further north along the road, and nearer to Ellesmere Port Catholic High School and Whitby Hall.

Local news
The school has received many news reports largely based around the success of the students. The school recently hit the headlines when it was voted Sports Secondary School of the Year for the whole Cheshire region.

In 2018, Whitby High School received 7075 GBP from Cheshire Community Foundation to engage learners in Hungerball. The project had a dual purpose of promoting informal exercise of the school population plus focused work with groups of vulnerable learners. The grant paid for equipment and venue hire, and staff time.

History

Grammar school
The Whitby High School was founded as a coeducational school until a girls' school was built next door in 1963.  The new school became Ellesmere Port County Grammar School for Boys, being situated on Chester Road and had around 950 boys. In 1974, the boys' school was one of the first in the country to use a new computer program to help choose careers options.

Girls' school
The girls' school was called Ellesmere Port Girls' Grammar School and was on Sycamore Drive. It had 850 girls, with 150 in the sixth form.

Comprehensive
Cheshire agreed to go comprehensive, in principle, in 1966. It became a co-educational comprehensive in 1973, being known as Whitby County Comprehensive School, then Whitby Comprehensive School.

Academic performance
GCSE results 2011 are 3rd highest in the region with 89% 5 A*-C, while A level result are above the normal of the area. Now the GCSE results have been raised again as last year 11, got an astounding 92% 5 A*-C.

Notable former pupils

 Philip Boyle, Ambassador to Mali from 2012 to 2014 and Ambassador to Madagascar from 2017
 Dave Challinor, footballer
Phil Morris (health activist)
 Oz James Osborne, Blacksmith
 Craig Sadler, Ancient Historian
Gideon Davies FRS FRSC FMedSci structural and chemical biologist working on structural biology, carbohydrates and glycobiology
 Rob Jones, footballer
 Mark Leckey, artist, won the 2008 Turner Prize
 Jayne McCubbin, BBC North West political reporter
 Jane Parry, Olympic athlete in 4x400 metres relay
 Corporal Marc Taylor, of 1st Regiment Royal Horse Artillery, REME, killed on 28 September 2004 at Basrah in Iraq

Ellesmere Port County Grammar School (both sections)
 John Basnett, rugby league player
 Colin Farrington, Director General from 1998 to 2010 of the Chartered Institute of Public Relations
 Dennis Farrington, President of the Board at SEE University since 2008; Council of Europe expert on higher education reform
 Karl J. Friston FRS, FMedSci, FRSB, is a British neuroscientist at University College London and an authority on brain imaging
 Beverley Hughes, MP
 Paul Jones, footballer
 Kevin Kennerley, footballer
 Roger Allen Leigh, Head of the School of Agriculture since 2006 at the University of Adelaide; Professor of Botany from 1998 to 2006 at the University of Cambridge; President from 2005–7 of the Society for Experimental Biology
 Rick Parry
 Barry Siddall, footballer
 Neil Whatmore, footballer
 Mick Wright, footballer

References

External links
 The Whitby High School – A Specialist Technology College
 EduBase
 The Whitby High School Prospectus

Educational institutions established in 1959
Secondary schools in Cheshire West and Chester
1959 establishments in England
Foundation schools in Cheshire West and Chester
Ellesmere Port